Owen Jameson Murphy (born September 27, 2003) is an American professional baseball pitcher in the Atlanta Braves organization.

Amateur career
Murphy began baseball-related activities at the age of four, when his father Mike signed him up for a class offered by the Riverside Recreation Department. Mike Murphy became his son's coach in Little League and travel league baseball when Owen was seven. When he was 13, Murphy began the Rake City baseball training program. Murphy attended Riverside Brookfield High School. He played high school baseball as a pitcher and shortstop, and was also a quarterback and wide receiver for the football team. During his junior season in 2021, he pitched to a 6–1 record and a 0.33 ERA alongside hitting nine home runs. As a senior in 2022, he went 9–0 with a 0.12 ERA, surrendering ten hits while striking out 137 batters over  innings and was named the Illinois Gatorade Player of the Year. He committed to play college baseball at the University of Notre Dame.

Professional career
The Atlanta Braves selected Murphy in the first round with the 20th overall selection of the 2022 Major League Baseball draft. He signed with the team for $2.56 million.

References

External links

2003 births
Living people
Baseball players from Illinois
Baseball pitchers
People from Brookfield, Illinois
Sportspeople from Cook County, Illinois